Ricardo Amor Nuño Pérez (1913–1940) was a Spanish anarchist, known for his role in the Spanish Civil War.

Biography 
At the beginning of the Spanish Civil War, in July 1936, he was secretary of the Madrid CNT. He was part of the juries of the so-called «Popular Courts», created after the Cárcel Modelo massacre. Nuño would have been in favor of the "walk" undertaken by the anarchist groups during the first weeks of the war, arguing that "expeditious justice strengthened the revolutionary morale of the people and engaged them in the struggle to life or death that we had engaged.” As Felipe Sandoval would later state, Amor Nuño would have had almost total control over the Madrid Checa.

In November 1936, he joined the Madrid Defense Council, occupying the Ministry of War Industries. Nuño reportedly participated in the November 7 meeting with representatives of the CNT and the JSU that served as preparation for the subsequent Paracuellos massacres.

At the beginning of December, he became the CEO of Transportation. At that time, Amor Nuño had a romantic relationship with the daughter of a nationalist soldier, whom he had made his personal secretary and even brought to Board meetings—which meant she had access to important information.  As a result of this relationship, he had seriously neglected his responsibilities. Some members of the CNT suspected that his sentimental partner was in fact a nationalist spy. A meeting of the CNT, the FAI and the FIJL resolved to expel Nuño Amor. At that time, he announced his resignation from his position, arguing health reasons. In this sense, Jorge Martínez Reverte pointed out that Amor Nuño left his post due to "fear". 

During the rest the war he did not hold any relevant position. On 4 May 1937 he was arrested in Barcelona for his involvement in the events of May.

There are several versions of his death. Julius Ruiz, on the other hand, maintains that he was tried by Franco's courts and sentenced to death—despite the favorable testimonies of well-known rightists—and was executed in 1940.

Notes

References

Bibliography 
 
 
 
 

1913 births
1940 deaths
Spanish anarchists
People executed by Francoist Spain
Executed Spanish people
Executed anarchists